Morteza Rostami (born January 28, 1980 in Iran) is an Iranian Taekwondo athlete who won a gold medal at the 2003 World Taekwondo Championships.
On his way to victory, he defeated Zrouri Abdelkader in the first round, Lipatov Ruslan in the second, Montesinos Ruben (the 2005 world champion) in the third, Zhu Feng and Kuzmanovic Milorad in the next two rounds and Asidah Zakaria in the final.

References 

1980 births
Living people
Iranian male taekwondo practitioners
Universiade bronze medalists for Iran
Universiade medalists in taekwondo
Medalists at the 2007 Summer Universiade
21st-century Iranian people